is a 1979 Japanese film directed by Yōichi Higashi.

Cast
 Kaori Momoi
 Eiji Okuda
 Juzo Itami
 Junkichi Orimoto
 Hiroaki Murakami

Awards and nominations
22nd Blue Ribbon Awards
 Won: Best Actress - Kaori Momoi

References

External links

1979 films
Films directed by Yōichi Higashi
1970s Japanese-language films
1970s Japanese films